List of Phacelia species. This plant genus is in the family Boraginaceae, basal in one of the 2 main euasterid lineages, as per Angiosperm Phylogeny Group. It is usually placed in the Hydrophylloideae subfamily.

This is a list of binomial names, including both accepted species and synonyms.

Source: Index Kewensis (at IPNI) and ITIS.

A

Phacelia acanthominthoides Elmer
Phacelia acaulis Brand
Phacelia adenophora Howell
Phacelia adspersa Brand
Phacelia affinis A.Gray
Phacelia alba Rydb.
Phacelia aldea R.Br. ex Sweet
Phacelia alpina Rydb.
Phacelia altotonga B.L.Turner
Phacelia alvordensis M.E.Jones
Phacelia amabilis Constance
Phacelia ambigua M.E.Jones
Phacelia anelsonii Macbride
Phacelia arenicola Brandegee

Phacelia argentea A.Nelson & Macbride
Phacelia argillacea Atwood
Phacelia arizonica A.Gray
Phacelia artemisioides Griseb.
Phacelia arthuri Greene
Phacelia austromontana Howell

B

Phacelia bakeri Macbride
Phacelia barnebyana Howell
Phacelia beatleyae Reveal & Constance
Phacelia bicknellii Small
Phacelia bicolor Torr. ex S.Wats.
Phacelia biennis A.Nelson
Phacelia bipinnatifida Michx.
Phacelia bolanderi - Bolander's phacelia, Bolander's scorpionweed, Blue-flowered grape-leaf, caterpillar flower
Phacelia boliviana Brand

Phacelia bombycina Wooton & Standl.
Phacelia boykinii Small
Phacelia brachyantha Benth.
Phacelia brachyloba A.Gray
Phacelia brachystemon Kunze ex Brand
Phacelia brannani Kellogg
Phacelia brevistylis Buckl.
Phacelia breweri A.Gray - Brewer's phacelia
Phacelia burkei Rydb.

C

Phacelia caerulea Greene
Phacelia californica Cham.
Phacelia calthifolia - Caltha-leaved phacelia
Phacelia campanularia - California bluebell
Phacelia campestris A.Nelson
Phacelia canescens Nutt.
Phacelia capitata Kruckeb.
Phacelia carmenensis B.L.Turner

Phacelia cedrosensis J.N.Rose
Phacelia cephalotes A.Gray
Phacelia cicutaria - caterpillar phacelia, caterpillar scorpionweed; includes P. hispida A.Gray
Phacelia ciliata Benth.
Phacelia ciliosa Rydb.
Phacelia cinerea Eastwood ex Macbride
Phacelia circinata Jacq.f.
Phacelia circinatiformis A.Gray
Phacelia clinopodioides Bert.
Phacelia conferta G.Don
Phacelia congdonii Greene

Phacelia congesta Hook.
Phacelia constancei Atwood
Phacelia cookei Constance & Heckard
Phacelia cooperae A.Gray
Phacelia cordifolia S.Wats. ex Brand
Phacelia corrugata A.Nelson
Phacelia corymbosa Jepson
Phacelia coulteri Greenm.
Phacelia covillei S.Watson
 
Phacelia crassifolia Parry or Torr. ex S.Wats.

Phacelia crenulata - notch-leaved phacelia
Phacelia cronquistiana S.L.Welsh
Phacelia cryptantha Greene
Phacelia cumingii A.Gray
Phacelia curvipes Torr. ex S.Wats.

D

Phacelia dalesiana Howell
Phacelia davidsonii A.Gray
Phacelia demissa A.Gray
Phacelia denticulata Osterh.
Phacelia dissecta Small
Phacelia distans Benth. - blue phacelia
Phacelia divaricata (Benth.) A.Gray
Phacelia dociana Jepson & Hoover
Phacelia douglasii Torr.
Phacelia dubia Trel. ex Trel., Branner & Coville

E

Phacelia egena (Greene ex Brand) Greene ex J.T. Howell
Phacelia eisenii Brandegee
Phacelia endiplus Steud.
Phacelia eremica Jepson
Phacelia exilis (Gray) G.J.Lee
Phacelia eximia Eastw.

F

Phacelia fallax Fernald
Phacelia filiae N.D.Atwood, F.J.Sm. & T.A.Knight
Phacelia filiformis Brand
Phacelia fimbriata - fringed phacelia
Phacelia firmomarginata A.Nelson
Phacelia flaccida Elmer
Phacelia floribunda Greene

Phacelia foliosa Phil.
Phacelia foliosepala A.Nelson & Macbride
Phacelia formosula Osterh.
Phacelia franklinii A.Gray - Franklin's phacelia
Phacelia fremontii - Fremont phacelia
Phacelia furcata Dougl. ex Hook.

G
 
Phacelia gentryi Constance
Phacelia geraniifolia Brand
Phacelia gilioides Brand
Phacelia glaberrima (Torr.ex S.Wats.)Howell
Phacelia glabra Nutt.
Phacelia glandulifera Piper
Phacelia glandulosa Nutt.
Phacelia glechomaefolia A.Gray
Phacelia grandiflora A.Gray
Phacelia greenei Howell
Phacelia grisea A.Gray
Phacelia gymnoclada Torr. ex S.Wats.
Phacelia gypsogenia I.M.Johnst.

H

Phacelia hardhamae Munz
Phacelia hastata Dougl. ex Lehm. - silverleaf scorpionweed
Phacelia heterophylla Pursh
Phacelia hintoniorum B.L.Turner
Phacelia hirsuta Nutt.
Phacelia hirtuosa A.Gray
Phacelia hossei Brand
Phacelia howelliana Atwood
Phacelia howellii Macbride
Phacelia humilis Torr ex Gray - low scorpionweed
Phacelia hydrophylloides Torr. ex A.Gray

I

Phacelia idahoensis L.F.Hend.
Phacelia imbricata Greene
Phacelia incana Brand.
Phacelia inconspicua Greene.
Phacelia indecora Howell
Phacelia infundibuliformis Torr.
Phacelia insularis Munz
Phacelia integrifolia Torr.
Phacelia inundata Howell
Phacelia invenusta A.Gray
Phacelia inyoensis (Macbride) Howell
Phacelia irritans Brand
Phacelia ivesiana Torr.
Phacelia ixodes Kellogg

K

Phacelia knighti A.Nelson

L

Phacelia laxa Small
Phacelia laxiflora Howell
Phacelia leibergii Brand
Phacelia lemmonii A.Gray
Phacelia lenta Piper
Phacelia leonis Howell
Phacelia leptosepala Rydb. - narrowsepal scorpionweed
Phacelia leptostachya Greene
Phacelia leucantha Lemmon ex Greene
Phacelia linearis Holzinger - linearleaf scorpionweed
Phacelia longipes Torr. ex A.Gray
Phacelia lutea (Hook. & Arn.)Howell
Phacelia luteopurpurea A.Nelson
Phacelia lyallii Rydb. - Lyall's phacelia
Phacelia lyonii (A.Gray) Rydb.

M

Phacelia maculata Wood
Phacelia malvifolia Cham. & Schlecht.
Phacelia mammillarensis Atwood
Phacelia marcescens Eastwood ex Macbride
Phacelia marshall-johnstonii N.D.Atwood & D.J.Pinkava
Phacelia minor - Whitlavia
Phacelia minutissima Hend.
Phacelia mohavensis A.Gray
Phacelia mollis Macbride  - Coffee Creek scorpionweed
Phacelia monoensis R.R.Halse
Phacelia monosperma A.Nelson
Phacelia mustelina Coville
Phacelia mutabilis Greene

N

Phacelia namatoides A.Gray
Phacelia nana Wedd.
Phacelia nashiana Jepson
Phacelia neffii B.L.Turner
Phacelia neglecta M.E.Jones
Phacelia nemoralis Greene.
Phacelia neomexicana Thurb. ex Torr.
Phacelia novenmillensis Munz
Phacelia nudicaulis Eastwood

O
 
Phacelia orbiculatis Rydb.
Phacelia orcuttiana A.Gray
Phacelia orogenes Brand

P

Phacelia pachyphylla A.Gray
Phacelia pallida I.M.Johnst.
Phacelia palmeri Torr. ex S.Wats.
Phacelia parishii A.Gray
Phacelia parryi Torr.
Phacelia parviflora Phil. or Pursh
Phacelia patuliflora A.Gray
Phacelia pauciflora S.Watson
Phacelia peckii Howell
Phacelia pedicellata A.Gray
Phacelia peirsoniana Howell
Phacelia perityloides Coville
Phacelia peruviana Spreng.
Phacelia petiolata I.M.Johnst.
Phacelia petrosa N.D.Atwood, F.J.Sm. & T.A.Knight
Phacelia phacelioides Brand - Mt. Diablo phacelia
Phacelia phyllomanica A.Gray
Phacelia piersoniae L.Williams
Phacelia pinnata Macbride
Phacelia pinnatifida Griseb. ex Wedd.
Phacelia platycarpa Spreng.
Phacelia platyloba A.Gray
Phacelia polysperma Brand
Phacelia popei Torr. & Gray
Phacelia potosina B.L.Turner
Phacelia pringlei A.Gray
Phacelia procera A.Gray

Phacelia prunellaefolia Bertero ex Brand
Phacelia pulchella A.Gray
Phacelia pulcherrima Constance
Phacelia purpusii Brandegee
Phacelia purshii - Miami mist

Q

Phacelia quickii Howell

R

Phacelia racemosa A.Heller
Phacelia rafaelensis Atwood
Phacelia ramosissima Dougl. ex Lehm. - branching scorpionweed
Phacelia ranunculacea (Nutt.)Constance
Phacelia rattanii A.Gray
Phacelia robusta (Macbride) I.M.Johnst.
Phacelia rotundifolia Torr. ex S.Wats.
Phacelia rudis Dougl. ex A.DC.
Phacelia rugulosa Lemmon. ex Greene
Phacelia rupestris Greene

S

Phacelia salina (A.Nelson) Howell
Phacelia sanzini Hicken
Phacelia saxicola A.Gray

Phacelia scariosa Brandegee
Phacelia scopulina (A.Nelson)Howell
Phacelia secunda J.F.Gmel.
Phacelia sericea A.Gray - silky scorpionweed
Phacelia serrata J.W.Voss
Phacelia setigera Phil.
Phacelia sinuata Phil.
Phacelia splendens Eastwood
Phacelia stebbinsii Constance & Heckard
Phacelia stellaris Brand
Phacelia stimulans Eastw.
Phacelia strictiflora A.Gray
Phacelia suaveolens Greene
Phacelia submutica Howell

T

Phacelia tanacetifolia Benth.
Phacelia tenuifolia Harv. ex Torr.
Phacelia tetramera Howell
Phacelia thermalis Greene
Phacelia trichostemoides Greene ex Brand
Phacelia trifoliata Gand.
Phacelia tripinnata Hort. ex Fisch. Mey. & Ave-Lall.

U

Phacelia umbrosa Greene
Phacelia utahensis J.W.Voss

V

Phacelia vallicola Congdon ex Brand
Phacelia vallis-mortae J.Voss
Phacelia verna Howell
Phacelia villosa Phil.
Phacelia vinifolia Paxt.
Phacelia violacea Brand
Phacelia viscida Torr.
Phacelia vitifolia Steud.
Phacelia vossii Atwood

W

Phacelia welshii Atwood
Phacelia whitlavia A.Gray

Z

Phacelia zaragozana B.L.Turner

External links

Phacelia